Leadership is a quarterly peer-reviewed academic journal that covers the field of management studies. The founding editors-in-chief were David Collinson and Keith Grint. The current editor of the journal is Dennis Tourish (University of Sussex). The journal was established in 2005 and is published by SAGE Publications.

Abstracting and indexing 
The journal is abstracted and indexed in Scopus and the Social Sciences Citation Index. According to the Journal Citation Reports, its 2013 impact factor is 1.000, ranking it 99th out of 172 journals in the category "Management".

References

External links 
 

SAGE Publishing academic journals
English-language journals
Quarterly journals
Business and management journals
Leadership studies
Publications established in 2005